Hinduism is the largest religion in South Asia with about 1.16 billion Hindus, forming just under two-thirds of South Asia's population. South Asia has the largest population of Hindus in the world, with about 99% of all global Hindus being from South Asia. Hinduism is the dominant religion in India and Nepal and is the second-largest religion in Bangladesh, Pakistan, Sri Lanka, and Bhutan.

Indo-Aryan migrations brought the Indo-Aryans to South Asia, where they compiled and composed the Vedic corpus during the Vedic period (ca. 1500-500 BCE) across present-day Northern India, Pakistan and Afghanistan.

Following the conquest of Islamic rulers in the Indian subcontinent and spread of Islam in South Asia, an era featuring persecution of Hindus began and continued till the end of Mughal Empire. The Vijayanagara and Maratha Empire have significantly protected Hinduism in the Indian subcontinent, while the Jaffna Kingdom and Gorkha dynasty have significantly protected Hinduism in Sri Lanka and Nepal respectively.

History

Origins 
The Indo-Aryans were pastoralists who migrated into north-western India after the collapse of the Indus Valley Civilization. Linguistic and archaeological data show a cultural change in the subcontinent after , with the linguistic and religious data clearly showing links with Indo-European languages and religion. Rudimentary state-forms appeared, of which the Kuru-Pañcāla union was the most influential. In this period, states Samuel emerged the Brahmana and Aranyaka layers of Vedic texts, which merged into the earliest Upanishads. These texts began to ask the meaning of a ritual, adding increasing levels of philosophical and metaphysical speculation, or " Hindu synthesis".

Rise of Hindu Nationalism 

With the passage of time and with the ongoing years, there has been an increase in the Hindu nationalism and feeling of Hindutva or Hindu identity among the Hindus of India. This has been observed especially after the formation of BJP government in India after 2014. There are many Hindu-nationalist political parties, out of which the BJP is the biggest among them. Besides them the RSS has been blamed as the chief organisation for the same.

The increase of Hindu nationalism and Hindutva is seen as a threat to the secular laws of India. It was also seen that the with rise of the Hindu nationalism, there has been an increase in the persecutions of religious minorities, especially on Muslims and Christians. The government of Narendra Modi is also blamed for the same. Many other hardliner Hindutva groups, such as Vishva Hindu Parishad (VHP) and Bajrang Dal (that are declared as paramilitary groups in many nations such as Australia, Canada and United States) have also contributed a major role in the enhancement of the Hindu nationalism and are also blamed for increasing Islamophobia in India and attacks on Christians.

Similarly in recent years, the same nationalism has also been experienced in Nepal, mainly after the year 2015 after the protests for re-declaration of Nepal as a Hindu State along with the restoration of Monarchy in the country. There have been increase in attack on Christians.

Temples

Organisations 
Most of the Hindu organisations are present in India and Nepal, though there are also in other South Asian counterparts.

Political 

 Bharatiya Janata Party
 Hindu Mahasabha
 Rastriya Prajatantra Party
 Pakistan Hindu Party

Social 

 Banga Sena
 Hindu Dharma Samudaya
 Siva Senai
 Hindu Prajatantrik Party

Demographics 

Hinduism is the majority religion in South Asia with most of the Hindus residing in the part. The 5 of the world's 10 nations by biggest Hindu population are in the region, including that of India, Nepal, Bangladesh, Pakistan and Sri Lanka and India with more than 1.16 billion Hindus consisting of 94% of the world's global Hindu population.

Hindus are majority community in Nepal and India with 81.6% and 79.8% respectively. Hindus are second largest religious group in Bangladesh, Pakistan, Sri Lanka, Bhutan and there is a very minute number of Hindus in Afghanistan. There are also no Hindus in Maldives, as per their laws.

In the recent year the share of Hindus have decreased in the South Asia, especially in Sri Lanka, Afghanistan, Bangladesh and Pakistan due to many reasons mainly persecution, forced conversion and low-fertility rate. The civil war in Afghanistan and Sri Lanka have caused Hindus to flee from there.

See also 

 Hinduism in Asia
 Hinduism in India
 Hinduism in Nepal
 Hinduism in Bangladesh
 Hinduism in Pakistan
 Hinduism in Sri Lanka
 Hinduism in Bhutan
 Hinduism in Afghanistan
 Hinduism in the Maldives

Notes

References

Citations

Sources

External links 
 
 

South Asia
Religion in South Asia